is a Japanese comedy trio consisting of ,   and . They are graduates of the Yoshimoto NSC Tokyo 12th generation and employed by Yoshimoto Kogyo. They are mostly active in Tokyo.

Members 

 Shinji Saitō (斉藤慎二) Born October 26, 1982 in Yachiyo, Chiba. Plays the boke, but has recently transitioned to also playing the tsukkomi. He aspired to be an actor before becoming a comedian and graduated with a degree for acting at the Toho Gakuen College of Drama and Music before joining Yoshimoto NSC.
 Hirohisa Ōta (太田博久) Born December 10, 1983 in Toyota, Aichi. Plays the boke. He is the main writer of the group's material and skits. His wife is the fashion model, Chihiro Kondo.
 Otake (おたけ) Born December 2, 1982 in Chūō, Tokyo. Plays the ponkotsu role, a persona that has become synonymous with Otake's character. He is currently a member of the comedy-focused idol group, Yoshimotozaka46.

Career  

The unit formed at a banquet party right before the 12th generation graduation when Ōta and Otake decided to partner up, with Saitō joining afterwards to form the trio. At first, Ōta was not thrilled to team up with Saitō. The name Jungle Pocket is named after the famous racehorse Jungle Pocket by Saitō who is a fan. Saito has gone on to own one of Jungle Pocket's last crops, a filly that he named Omataseshimashita.

Jungle Pocket made several appearances on King of Conte for their conte and M-1 Grand Prix and The Manzai for their manzai. They reached the semi-finals for King of Conte 6 years in a row until 2015, when they made it to the finals for the first time. Since then, the group gained popularity and make frequent appearances on television.

Achievements

King of Conte 
 2008 - 2nd Round
 2009 - Semi-Finalist
 2010 - Semi-Finalist
 2011 - Semi-Finalist
 2012 - Semi-Finalist
 2013 - Semi-Finalist
 2014 - Semi-Finalist
 2015 - Finalist (4th Place)
 2016 - Finalist (Runners-up)
 2017 - Finalist (4th Place)
 2018 - Semi-Finalist

M-1 Grand Prix 

 2007 - 2nd Round
 2008 - 3rd Round
 2009 - Semi-Finalist
 2010 - Quarter-Finalist
 2015 - Quarter-Finalist

The Manzai 

 2011 - 2nd Round
 2012 - Certified Manzai Comedian
 2013 - 2nd Round
 2014 - Certified Manzai Comedian

References

External links 

 Official Profile on Yoshimoto
 
 
 

Japanese comedy troupes
Japanese YouTube groups